Pavel Kustov (born 1965) is a Soviet former ski jumper.

References

1965 births
Living people
Russian male ski jumpers
Place of birth missing (living people)
Date of birth missing (living people)
20th-century Russian people